Pettie is a surname. Notable people with the surname include:

Don Pettie (1927–2017), Canadian sprinter
George Pettie (1548–1589), English writer of romances
Jim Pettie (1953–2019), Canadian ice hockey player
John Pettie (1839–1893), Scottish painter